The list of ship commissionings in 1987 includes a chronological list of all ships commissioned in 1987.


See also 

1987
 Ship commissionings